Brydie Parker (born 25 October 1999) is an Australian rugby league footballer who plays for the Sydney Roosters in the NRL Women's Premiership and the Central Coast Roosters in the NSWRL Women's Premiership. 

Background
Parker was born in Muswellbrook, New South Wales and played her junior rugby league for the Muswellbrook Rams.

Playing career
On 27 July 2018, Parker earned a contract with the Sydney Roosters NRL Women's Premiership team after being spotted at the NRL's Talent ID day held on the Gold Coast, Queensland. 

On 30 September 2018, she started on the wing in the Roosters' 12–34 Grand Final loss to the Brisbane Broncos.

In 2019, she joined the Mounties NSWRL Women's Premiership team. Parker was in the Roosters' NRLW squad for 2019 but did not play a game.

In 2020, Parker joined the Central Coast Roosters, winning a NSWRL Women's Premiership Grand Final with the team. On 25 October 2020, she started on the wing for the Roosters in their NRLW Grand Final loss to the Brisbane Broncos.

References

External links
Sydney Roosters profile

1999 births
Living people
Australian female rugby league players
Rugby league wingers
Rugby league centres
Sydney Roosters (NRLW) players